Jackie and Oopjen is a 2021 Dutch family film.  The film premiered at the Mill Valley Film Festival.

Plot
Oopjen Coppit escapes from her painting in the Rijksmuseum in search of her long lost sister.

References

External links 
 

2020 films
Dutch children's films
2020s Dutch-language films